Nehesy Aasehre (Nehesi) was a ruler of Lower Egypt during the fragmented Second Intermediate Period. He is placed by most scholars into the early 14th Dynasty, as either the second or the sixth pharaoh of this dynasty. As such he is considered to have reigned for a short time c. 1705 BC and would have ruled from Avaris over the eastern Nile Delta. Recent evidence makes it possible that a second person with this name, a son of a Hyksos king, lived at a slightly later time during the late 15th Dynasty c. 1580 BC. It is possible that most of the artefacts attributed to the king Nehesy mentioned in the Turin canon, in fact belong to this Hyksos prince.

Family
In his review of the Second Intermediate Period, egyptologist Kim Ryholt proposed that Nehesy was the son and direct successor of the pharaoh Sheshi with a Nubian Queen named Tati. Egyptologist Darrell Baker, who also shares this opinion, posits that Tati must have been Nubian or of Nubian descent, hence Nehesy's name meaning The Nubian. The 14th dynasty being of Canaanite origin, Nehesy is also believed to be of Canaanite descent.

Four scarabs found, including one from Semna in Nubia and three of unknown provenance, point to a temporary coregency with his father. Furthermore, one scarab mentions Nehesy as King's son and a further 22 as Eldest king son. Ryholt and Baker thus hold the view that Nehesy became the heir to the throne after the death of his elder brother, Prince Ipqu.

Manfred Bietak and Jürgen von Beckerath believe that Nehesy was the second ruler of the 14th dynasty. Bietak further posits that his father was an Egyptian military officer or administrator, who funded an independent kingdom centered on Avaris. The kingdom controlled the northeastern Nile Delta, at the expense of the concurrent 13th dynasty.

Attestation

In spite of a very short reign of around a year, Nehesy is the best attested ruler of the 14th dynasty.
According to Ryholt's latest reading of the Turin canon, Nehesy is attested there on the 1st entry of the 9th column (Gardiner, entry 8.1) and is the first king of the 14th dynasty whose name is preserved on this king list.

Nehesy is also attested by numerous contemporary artefacts, foremost among which are scarab seals. In addition, a fragmentary obelisk from the Temple of Seth in Raahu bears his name together with the inscription "king's eldest son". A seated statue, later usurped by Merneptah, is believed to have originally belonged to Nehesy. It is inscribed with "Seth, Lord of Avaris", and was found in Tell el Muqdam.

Nehesy is also attested by two relief fragments inscribed with the names of the king, which were unearthed in Tell el-Dab'a in the mid 1980s. Finally, two further stelae are known from Tell-Habuwa (ancient Tjaru): one bearing Nehesy's birth name, the other one the throne of the king Aahsere.<ref>M. Abd el-Maqsoud: Un monument du roi ˁ3-sḥ-Rˁ Nehsy à Tell-Habua (Sinaï Nord), ASAE 69 (1983), 3-5</ref> Thanks to these stelae it was possible to connect the name Nehesy with the throne name Aahsere ˁ3-sḥ-Rˁ. Before this discovery, Aasehre was regarded as a Hyksos king.

In 2005, a further stele of Nehesy was discovered in the fortress city of Tjaru, once the starting point of the Way of Horus, the major road leading out of Egypt into Canaan. The stele shows a king's son Nehesy offering oil to the god Banebdjedet and also bears an inscription mentioning the king's sister Tany. A woman with this name and title is known from other sources around the time of the Hyksos king Apophis, who ruled at the end of the Second Intermediate Period c. 1580 BC. Daphna Ben-Tor, who studied the scarabs of Nehesy, concludes that those referring to the king's son Nehesy are different in style from those referring to Nehesy as a king. She thus wonders whether the king's son Nehesy'' might be a different person from the better known king of the same name. In this situation, king Nehesy would still be an early 14th Dynasty ruler, but some of the attestations attributed to him would in fact belong to a Hyksos prince.

Reign
According to the Austrian Egyptologist Manfred Bietak, Nehesy's 14th Dynasty kingdom started during the late 13th Dynasty, around or just after 1710 BC, as a result of the slow disintegration of the 13th Dynasty. After this event, "no single ruler was able to control the whole of Egypt" until Ahmose I captured Avaris. Alternatively, Ryholt believes that the 14th dynasty started a century before Nehesy's reign, c. 1805 BC during Sobekneferu's reign. Since the 13th dynasty was the direct continuation of the 12th, he proposes that the birth of the 14th is the origin of the distinction between the 12th and the 13th in the Egyptian tradition.

Nehesy's authority may have "encompassed the eastern Delta from Tell el-Muqdam to Tel Habuwa (where his name occurs), but the universal practise of usurpation and quarrying of earlier monuments complicates the picture. Given that the only examples that were certainly found at the sites where they once stood are those from Tell el-Habua and Tell el-Daba, his kingdom may actually have been much smaller."

After Nehesy's death, the 14th dynasty continued to rule in the Delta region of Lower Egypt with a number of ephemeral or short-lived rulers until 1650 BC when the Hyksos 15th Dynasty conquered the Delta. Nehesy seems to have been remembered long after his death as several locations in the eastern Delta bore names such as "The mansion of Pinehsy" and "The Place of the Asiatic Pinehsy", Pinehsy being a late Egyptian rendering of Nehesy.

See also
List of pharaohs

References

18th-century BC Pharaohs
Pharaohs of the Fourteenth Dynasty of Egypt
Egyptian people of Nubian descent